Bernard Okoe-Boye is a Ghanaian politician and member of the Seventh Parliament of the Fourth Republic of Ghana representing the Ledzokuku Constituency in the Greater Accra Region on the ticket of the New Patriotic Party.   He is currently the board chairman of the Korle Bu Teaching Hospital, the nation's largest medical facility.

Early life and education 
He comes from Teshie which falls under the Ledzokuku  Constituency where he serves as member of Parliament. He attended the Field Engineers Junior High School for his Basic Education Certificate. Okoe-Boye is an old student of the Presbyterian Boys' Secondary School ( Presec-Legon) where he completed his secondary school education in the year 2000. Bernard Okoe Boye is a licensed medical practitioner by profession, who holds BSC in Human Biology, Medicine and Surgery from the Kwame Nkrumah University of Science and Technology.  He also holds a master's degree in Public Health (MPH) from Hamburg School of Applied Science and an A1 certificate in German from the Geothe Institute, Accra.

Career

Health sector 
Okoe-Boye had his house job at the Ghana Health Service from 2009 to 2012 at the Central Regional Hospital, Department of Surgery, Pediatrics and Obstetrics and Gynecology, Cape Coast from 2009 to 2011 and then at the Department of Internal Medicine, Tema General Hospital.  He then continued as a medical officer in the same institution for four years where he worked at Kibi Government Hospital, Department of Obstetrics and Gynecology and the La General Hospital. Prior to his entry into parliament, Oko-Boye was a medical officer at the LekMA Hospital in Accra.

Politics 
Okoe-Boye was elected MP for Ledzokuku Constituency in the Greater Accra Region on 7 December 2016 was sworn in on 7 January 2017. He is a member of the Health and Government Assurances Committees of Parliament.

On 4 April 2020, Okoe-Boye was nominated by President Akufo-Addo to serve as a deputy health minister and was subsequently sworn in on 21 April 2020. He however lost the Ledzokuku parliamentary seat in the 2020 Ghanaian general election to Benjamin Ayiku Narteh of the NDC.

References

Ghanaian MPs 2017–2021
1982 births
Living people
Presbyterian Boys' Senior High School alumni
Kwame Nkrumah University of Science and Technology alumni
Ghanaian obstetricians
Medical doctors from Accra
Ghanaian gynaecologists